Onobara was a town of ancient Lycia, which per the Stadiasmus Patarensis was the destination of a road from Trabenna.
 
Its site is located near Göderler, Asiatic Turkey.

References

Populated places in ancient Lycia
Former populated places in Turkey